Mapos Buang, also known as Mapos or Central Buang, is an Oceanic language in Morobe Province, Papua New Guinea.

Phonology 
Mapos Buang has a larger sound inventory than is typical of most Austronesian languages. Notable is the existence of a phonemic contrast between a velar nasal and a uvular nasal, which is extremely rare among the world's languages. Along with this, its phonology is unusually symmetrical compared to most other languages.

Vowels 

*  is a prominent feature of Buang phonology, but is not contrastive.

Vowel length is shown in the orthography by doubling the letter.

Consonants 

* is a bilabial approximant or semivowel with no co-articulated velar component. It is placed in the labio-velar series of the chart as it fills a gap in this position.  is a voiced bilabial fricative.

Orthography is the same as in the IPA when nothing is shown.

References

External links 
 Mapos Buang dictionary (with phonology and grammar)

South Huon Gulf languages
Languages of Morobe Province